Vallot Glacier is a glacier flowing northwest to Laubeuf Fjord close south of Lewis Peaks, on Arrowsmith Peninsula in Graham Land. It was mapped by the Falkland Islands Dependencies Survey (FIDS) from surveys and air photos, 1948–59, and was named by the United Kingdom Antarctic Place-Names Committee (UK-APC) for Joseph Vallot, a French naturalist and glaciologist who first measured the surface velocity of a glacier over a long period, in Switzerland, 1891–99.

Further reading 
 Jane G. Ferrigno, Alison J. Cook, Amy M. Mathie, Richard S. Williams, Jr., Charles Swithinbank, Kevin M. Foley, Adrian J. Fox, Janet W. Thomson, and Jörn Sievers, Coastal-Change and Glaciological Map of the Larsen Ice Shelf Area, Antarctica: 1940–2005, U.S. Geological Survey, Reston, Virginia: 2008

External links 

 Vallot Glacier on USGS website
 Vallot Glacier on AADC website
 Vallot Glacier on SCAR website
 Vallot Glacier - distance calculator

References 

Glaciers of Loubet Coast